This is a list of all cricketers who have captained Namibia in an official international match. This includes the ICC Trophy, Under-19's games and One Day Internationals. The article is correct as of 19 December 2020.

One Day Internationals

Namibia player their first ODI on February 10, 2003.

Twenty20 Internationals 

Namibia player their first ODI on February 10, 2003.

ICC Trophy 

Namibia debuted in the ICC Trophy in the 1993/94 tournament

Youth One-Day International captains

This is a list of Namibian cricketers who have captained their country in an Under-19's ODI.

References

External links
Cricinfo
Namibia's ICC Trophy captains at Cricket Archive 
Namibia's Under-19 captains at Cricket Archive 

Captains
Namibia